Johnnie James Morton, Jr. (born October 7, 1971) is a former American football wide receiver in the National Football League (NFL) during the 1990s and 2000s.  He played college football for the University of Southern California (USC), and was recognized as an All-American in 1993.  Originally drafted by the Detroit Lions in the first round in the 1994 NFL Draft, he also played professionally for the Kansas City Chiefs and San Francisco 49ers of the NFL. Morton also had a brief career in mixed martial arts fighting in 2007.

Early years
Morton was born in Torrance, California.  He attended South High School in Torrance, California and played for the South High Spartans high school football team.

College career
While attending the University of Southern California, Morton played for the USC Trojans football team from 1990 to 1993.   He broke twelve USC team and Pacific-10 Conference records for receptions and receiving yards.  Morton was nicknamed "Big Play Morton" by Tom Kelly, and "Johnnie Hero" by USC broadcaster Pete Arbogast, thanks to a game-winning touchdown pass Morton caught in the 1990 USC-UCLA rivalry game—a 23-yard strike from Trojans quarterback Todd Marinovich with 16 seconds left that gave the Trojans a 45-42 come-from-behind victory.

Professional career
He would go on to achieve an important secondary role on a deep Lions' receiving corps that also featured Pro Bowl flanker Herman Moore and veteran Brett Perriman. After learning the ropes as a rookie in 1994, Morton became Detroit's featured slot receiver in 1995 and a key contributor on special teams as a kickoff/punt returner. Morton was part of one of the most prolific offenses in Detroit history that year, as the Lions would rack up 436 total points (second highest in the NFL) and end up with ten victories - appearing in the playoffs for the third straight season. He contributed 44 receptions on that team for 590 yards and 8 touchdowns. Perhaps his most memorable game occurred that same season during a classic Thanksgiving Day game in Detroit against the Minnesota Vikings. Moore (127 yards), Perriman (153), and Johnnie Morton (102) all eclipsed the 100-yard receiving mark, and Hall of Fame running back Barry Sanders rushed for 138 yards, and quarterback Scott Mitchell passed for 410 yards in a 44-38 Lions' shootout victory.

After the departure of Perriman, Morton became more of a featured receiver in Detroit's offense in the ensuing years. His best season statistically was during the 1999 season when he had 80 receptions for 1129 yards on a surprising Lions team that made the playoffs that year, despite the unexpected retirement of Barry Sanders. All told, Morton finished his pro career with 624 receptions for 8719 yards and 43 touchdowns. He currently ranks third on Detroit's all-time list in both receptions and yards-receiving, with 469 and 6,499, respectively.

NFL career statistics
Receiving Stats

Personal life
Morton's older brother, Michael Morton, played at UNLV and younger brother, Chad Morton played at USC. The Morton family is of African American and Japanese ethnicity.

Morton had a brief cameo appearance in the movie Jerry Maguire and the television series Moesha.

During the 2001 season, comedian Jay Leno had been poking fun at the Lions' 0-12 record. When the Lions won their first game of the season 27-24 against the Minnesota Vikings, Morton, who knew of Leno's comments, said, "I got the damn monkey off my back, off Marty's back, and I want Jay Leno to kiss my ass." Morton later appeared on The Tonight Show, during which Leno kissed a donkey.

Mixed martial arts record

|-
| Loss
| align=center| 0–1
| Bernard Ackah
| KO (punch)
| K-1 Dynamite!! USA
| 
| align=center| 1
| align=center| 0:38
| Los Angeles, California, United States
|

See also
List of male mixed martial artists

References

External links
Professional MMA record.

1971 births
Living people
African-American players of American football
All-American college football players
American football wide receivers
Players of American football from Torrance, California
American male mixed martial artists
American sportspeople in doping cases
Detroit Lions players
Doping cases in mixed martial arts
Glenville State Pioneers football coaches
Kansas City Chiefs players
Light heavyweight mixed martial artists
Mixed martial artists from California
San Francisco 49ers players
USC Trojans football players
American sportspeople of Japanese descent
21st-century African-American sportspeople
20th-century African-American sportspeople